Bongja is a 2000 South Korean film.

Plot
A seaweed roll maker named Ok Bong-ja finds a teenaged runway-turned prostitute lying down on the road and takes her to her home, where their friendship turns into mutual attraction.

Cast
Seo Kap-sook ... Ok Bong-ja
Shim Yi-young
Kim Il-woo
Choi Dae-woong
Min Kyoung-jin
Kim Ju-hong
Lee Yong-yi
Seon Uk-hyeon
Park Jae-hyeon

References

External links
 
 

South Korean drama films
2000 drama films
2000 films
South Korean LGBT-related films
Lesbian-related films
Films directed by Park Chul-soo
LGBT-related drama films
2000 LGBT-related films
2000s South Korean films
2000s Korean-language films